Lift or LIFT may refer to:

Physical devices
 Elevator, or lift, a device used for raising and lowering people or goods
 Paternoster lift, a type of lift using a continuous chain of cars which do not stop
 Patient lift, or Hoyer lift, mobile lift, ceiling lift, a lift to assist a caregiver for a disabled patient
 Rack lift, a type of elevator
 Ski lift, an aerial or surface lift for uphill transport
 Space elevator, a hypothetical structure for transporting material from a planet's surface into outer space
 Wheelchair lift or platform lift, a powered device to assist a person in a wheelchair
 Forklift, a powered industrial truck used to lift and move materials short distances
 Scissor lift, a type of aerial work platform
 Body lift, an adaptation (of fixed height) to lift the automobile body from the frame
 Suspension lift, a modification raising the suspension of the automobile
 Stairlift, a mechanical device to help people with disabilities get up stairs

Sport 

 A specific way of lifting a barbell, dumbbell(s), kettlebell, or other piece of sporting equipment in a strength sport (e.g. weightlifting, weight training, powerlifting), such as
 clean-and-jerk, snatch, deadlift, squat, bench press, military press, clean-and-press, dumbbell curl, fly, calf raise, two hands anyhow
 Figure skating lifts, movements in pair skating and ice dancing
 Sky Paragliders Lift, a Czech paraglider design

Science and technology
 Lift (force), in fluid dynamics, a force generated by an object moving through a fluid
 Lift coefficient, a coefficient that relates the lift generated by a lifting body to other parameters
 Lift (soaring), rising air used by soaring birds and glider, hang glider and paraglider pilots for soaring flight
 Lift (data mining), a measure of the performance of a model at segmenting the population
 Lift (web framework), a web application framework for Scala

Mathematics
 Lift (mathematics), a morphism h from X to Z such that gh = f
 Homotopy lifting property, a unique path over a map
 Covering graph or lift

Cosmetics
 Shoe lifts, a removable shoe insert
 Elevator shoes, shoes that have thickened sections of the insoles
 Plastic surgery, surgery to lift the skin
 Rhytidectomy or face lift, a type of plastic surgery
 Mastopexy or breast lift, a type of plastic surgery

Media
 London International Festival of Theatre (LIFT)

Films
 The Lift, a 1983 Dutch horror film by Dick Maas
 Lift (2021 film), a 2021 Indian Tamil-language horror drama film
 Lift (2023 film), an upcoming American heist comedy film

Music
 Lift (band), a German rock band

Albums
 Lift (Audio Adrenaline album) (2001) and its title track
 Lift (Love and Rockets album) (1998)
 Lift (Sister Hazel album) (2004)
 Lift (Shannon Noll album) (2005)
 Lift (Dave Gunning album)
 Lift: Live at the Village Vanguard, a 2004 album by Chris Potter

Songs
 "Lift" (Poets of the Fall song), (2004)
 "Lift" (Shannon Noll song)
 "Lift" (Sean Tyas song) (2006)
 "Lift" (Radiohead song)

Other uses
 LIFT (nonprofit), a nonprofit anti-poverty organization
 LIFT (airline), South African Domestic Airline
 Lead-in fighter trainer, a type of advanced military training aircraft
 Legal Information for Families Today (LIFT), nonprofit that provides legal information in New York State, US
 Lift (soft drink), a brand of carbonated beverage produced and marketed by the Coca-Cola Company
 Airlift, in logistics, the act of transporting people or cargo from point to point using aircraft
 Hitchhiking, a form of transport in which the traveller tries to get a lift (or ride) from another traveller
 Lift, a special type of arrow in the video game engine StepMania

See also
 Lifting (disambiguation)
 List of weight training exercises
 Belt manlift, a belt with rungs and steps for moving people vertically
 Lyft, a ridesharing company